Jacques Villain (13 March 1934 – 12 June 2022) was a French physicist. He received his PhD at the École normale supérieure, did research at the Institut Laue-Langevin in Grenoble, held, from 1984 to 1988, the position of a director at the Jülich Research Centre in Germany, and he was, since 1996, directeur des recherches at the  Commissariat à l'énergie atomique. In the year 2000 he was elected as a member of the Académie des sciences.

His main research areas are in Statistical Physics, Solid State Physics, and Surface Science. He is best known for his excellent contributions to the theory of crystal growth, surface dynamics, low-dimensional magnetism, as well as spatially modulated, commensurate and incommensurate structures in solids.

External links 
 Citation of Jacques Villain by the Académie des sciences with biography

1934 births
2022 deaths
French physicists
École Normale Supérieure alumni
Members of the French Academy of Sciences
French Alternative Energies and Atomic Energy Commission